The Minister for Consumer Affairs is a cabinet minister within the Government of Sweden and appointed by the Prime Minister of Sweden.

The minister is responsible for issues regarding consumer protection. The position of Minister for Consumer Affairs has usually been held by a minister as a part of a wider ministerial portfolio, and it has sorted under different ministries throughout the years.

List of Ministers for Consumer Affairs

Other positions of the ministers and ministry history

References

Swedish politicians
Government of Sweden